New Albany is the name of several places in the United States of America:

Localities
New Albany, Indiana
New Albany, Kansas
New Albany, Mississippi
New Albany, New Jersey
New Albany, Ohio, a city in Franklin and Licking counties
New Albany, Mahoning County, Ohio, an unincorporated community
New Albany, Pennsylvania
New Albany, Wisconsin, the former name of Beloit, Wisconsin

Townships
New Albany Township (disambiguation)

Schools and school districts
New Albany High School (Indiana)
New Albany High School (Ohio)
New Albany-Plain Local School District (Ohio)

See also
 Albany (disambiguation) 
 Because the name New Albany means "New Scotland", it is semantically and historically related to other similar names for British colonies, including: 
 New Britain (disambiguation)
 New Albion (disambiguation)
 New Scotland (disambiguation)
 Nova Scotia (disambiguation) 
 New Albany (disambiguation) 
 New Caledonia (disambiguation) 
 New England (disambiguation)
 New Wales (disambiguation)
 Scottish place names in other countries